Hadewijch, sometimes referred to as Hadewych or Hadewig (of Brabant or of Antwerp) was a 13th-century poet and mystic, probably living in the Duchy of Brabant. Most of her extant writings are in a Brabantian form of Middle Dutch. Her writings include visions, prose letters and poetry. Hadewijch was one of the most important direct influences on John of Ruysbroeck.

Life
No details of her life are known outside the sparse indications in her own writings. Her Letters suggest that she functioned as the head of a beguine house, but that she had experienced opposition that drove her to a wandering life. This evidence, as well as her lack of reference to life in a convent, makes the nineteenth-century theory that she was a nun problematic, and it has been abandoned by modern scholars. She must have come from a wealthy family: her writing demonstrates an expansive knowledge of the literature and theological treatises of several languages, including Latin and French, as well as French courtly poetry, in a period when studying was a luxury only exceptionally granted to women.

Works

Most of Hadewijch's extant writings, none of which survived the Middle Ages as an autograph, are in a Brabantian form of Middle Dutch. Five groups of texts survive: her writings include poetry, descriptions of her visions, and prose letters. There are two groups of poetry: Poems in Stanzas (Strophische Gedichten) and Poems in Couplets (Mengeldichten). Finally there is the "Lijst der volmaakten" ("list of the perfect ones").

Poems in Stanzas (Strophische Gedichten)
Her forty-five Poems in Stanzas (Strophische Gedichten, also Liederen, "Songs") are lyric poems following the forms and conventions used by the trouvères and minnesingers of her time, but in Dutch, and with the theme of worldly courtship replaced by sublimated love to God. Many of them are contrafacta of Latin and vernacular songs and hymns, leading to a Dutch edition renaming them "Liederen" ("Songs") and including audio recordings of performances.

Poems in Couplets (Mengeldichten or Berijmde brieven)

The sixteen Poems in Couplets (Mengeldichten, also Berijmde brieven, "letters on rhyme") are simpler didactical poems in letter format, composed in rhyming couplets, on Christian topics; not all of them are considered authentic.

Visions 

Hadewijch's Book of Visions (Visioenenboek), the earliest vernacular collection of such revelations, appears to have been composed in the 1240s. It prominently features dialogue between Hadewijch and Christ in visionary speech, an early example of this mode of vernacular religious instruction.

Letters

Thirty prose letters also survive: here Hadewijch explains her views, and they give some context to her life.

List
The Lijst der volmaakten ("list of the perfect ones"), is joined to the Visions in some manuscripts, and to the Poems in Stanzas in a more recent one. It lists several saints, like Bernard of Clairvaux, but some entries are more remarkable, like a beguine who had been condemned to death by the inquisition.

Influence
Hadewijch's writings influenced Jan van Ruusbroec both as a theologian and a mystic.

Veneration
In 2022, Hadewijch was officially added to the Episcopal Church liturgical calendar with a feast day on 22 April.

Notes

References

Sources

Editions, translations, and recordings

Studies
 Swan, Laura. The Wisdom of the Beguines: the Forgotten Story of a Medieval Women's Movement (BlueBridge, 2014).

External links

Hadewijch in the Columbia Encyclopedia
Hadewijch at DBNL (digitale bibliotheek voor Nederlandse letteren) Introductions (most of them in Dutch) and various editions of Hadewijch's writings in Middle Dutch
Poetry by Hadewijch in English translation
Nicolette, Carlos Eduardo. "Hadewijch de Amberes: a mística medieval e suas visões sobre o divino" in Revista Mais Que Amélias, 2017 (with English abstract)

Flemish Christian mystics
Dutch-language poets
Middle Dutch writers
13th-century women writers
Beguines and Beghards
Medieval women poets
People from the Duchy of Brabant
Anglican saints
Women mystics